Joel Joshghene Asoro (born 27 April 1999) is a Swedish professional footballer who plays as a striker for Djurgårdens IF.

Club career

Early career
Asoro started his career in his local club IFK Haninge in a southern Stockholm suburb. When he was eleven years old he moved to IF Brommapojkarna, well known throughout Sweden for its youth academy which has produced players such as John Guidetti, Albin Ekdal, Simon Tibbling, Dejan Kulusevski and Ludwig Augustinsson. Asoro was targeted for some of Europe's leading clubs, among them Manchester City, Manchester United, Chelsea and Juventus.

Sunderland
Asoro signed for English side Sunderland in 2015. On 21 August 2016, a year after joining the club, Asoro made his professional debut in the Premier League against Middlesbrough, coming on as an 81st-minute substitute for Duncan Watmore; in doing so he became Sunderland's youngest Premier League player, as well as the youngest Swedish national to feature. On 24 August 2016, Asoro was given his first Sunderland start under manager David Moyes in a 1–0 victory over League One side Shrewsbury Town in an EFL Cup second round tie. Asoro later appeared as a starter in the EFL Cup Round 3 victory over Championship side Queens Park Rangers and was subbed off for Josh Maja.

Swansea City
Asoro joined Swansea City on a four-year contract for a fee of £2 million in July 2018.

Loan to FC Groningen
On 15 August 2019, Asoro agreed to a loan move to Eredivisie club FC Groningen for the 2019–20 season. He made 17 appearances and scored three goals for the side before the football season in the Netherlands was suspended in March.

Loan to Genoa
On 16 September 2020, Asoro joined Serie A club Genoa on a season-long loan deal with a conditional obligation to buy.

Djurgårdens IF
On 8 February 2021, Asoro signed with Allsvenskan club Djurgårdens IF, keeping him with the club until 31 December 2024.

International career
On 5 September 2016, Asoro made his debut for Sweden U21 starting the game against Spain in 1–1 draw. He made his full international debut for Sweden on 9 January 2023, replacing Christoffer Nyman 82 minutes into a friendly 2–0 win against Finland in which he also scored his first international goal.

Personal life
Asoro's parents are from Nigeria. His sister, Abigail Glomazic is a professional basketball player who has played with the likes of CCC Polkowice and Sleza Wroclaw in Poland.

Career statistics

Club

International 

 Scores and results list Sweden's goal tally first, score column indicates score after each Asoro goal.

References

1999 births
Living people
Swedish footballers
Sweden international footballers
Sweden youth international footballers
Swedish people of Nigerian descent
Sunderland A.F.C. players
Swansea City A.F.C. players
FC Groningen players
Genoa C.F.C. players
Djurgårdens IF Fotboll players
Association football forwards
Premier League players
English Football League players
Eredivisie players
Allsvenskan players
Expatriate footballers in England
Swedish expatriate footballers
Swedish expatriate sportspeople in England
Swedish expatriate sportspeople in the Netherlands
Swedish expatriate sportspeople in Italy
Expatriate footballers in Wales
Expatriate footballers in the Netherlands
Expatriate footballers in Italy
Footballers from Stockholm